Nome is a municipality in Telemark in the county of Vestfold og Telemark in Norway. It is a part of the traditional region of Midt-Telemark and historically of Grenland region. The administrative centre of the municipality is the village of Ulefoss.

The municipality of Nome was created on 1 January 1964 when the two former municipalities of Holla and Lunde were merged.  Nome consists of a number of villages including Lunde, Ulefoss, Helgen, Flåbygd, and Svenseid.

The area of the farmlands is 26.8 square kilometers (as of 2013); barley is farmed on 4.9 sq.kilometers.

General information

Name
The municipality of Nome was created in 1964 and the name was taken from a lake in the river of Eidselva. The meaning of the name is unknown (maybe related to the first element in the name Numedal).

Coat-of-arms
The coat-of-arms is from modern times.  They were granted in 1989. The arms are silver and blue and are divided party per bend sinister to look like steps.  It is meant to represent the Telemark Canal which runs through the municipality.

Romnes Church
Romnes church (Romnes kirke)  is a Romanesque stone church. It was built between 1150 and 1250.  The church was constructed of stone joined with lime, while the corners consist of limestone.  The apse and nave has a flat ceiling, while the choir has vaulted wood ceilings. The entrance portal to the west is of decorated stone.  The church also had an entrance on the south wall in the choir. The pulpit and baroque altarpiece are from the 1700s. The square bell tower dates to the end of the 1800s. The church currently has curved red bricks on the roof. During the restoration in 1921, murals from the late Middle Ages were restored. Additional restoration was conducted between 1966-1967.

Notable people 

 Baron Herman Severin Løvenskiold (1815 in Ulefoss – 1870) a Norwegian composer
 August Cappelen (1827–1852) painter of melancholic, dramatic and romantic landscapes; brought up in Holla
 Gisle Straume (1917 in Holla – 1988) a Norwegian actor and theatre director 
 Inge Grødum (born 1943 in Ulefoss) a Norwegian illustrator 
 Knut Ragnar Mikkelsen (born 1951 in Lunde) a Norwegian police chief
 Odd Einar Haugen (born 1954 in Lunde) a Bergen professor of Old Norse philology
 Liv Mildrid Gjernes (born 1954 in Lunde) is a Norwegian artist, eponymn for a contemporary style of decoration, sculpture and furniture design - Gjernes
 Atle Skårdal (born 1966 in Lunde) a former World Cup and Olympic alpine ski racer
 Jon Anders Halvorsen (born 1968 in Lunde) a Norwegian folk singer and physician
 Erland Dahlen (born 1971 in Ulefoss) a Norwegian drummer and percussionist
 Torun Eriksen (born 1977 in Lunde) a Norwegian jazz singer

Gallery

References

External links

Municipal fact sheet from Statistics Norway

 
Municipalities of Vestfold og Telemark